Michael O'Neill (born 29 November 1960) is an English former professional rugby league footballer who played in the 1970s, 1980s and 1990s.

Background
Mike O'Neill was born in Widnes, Lancashire, England.

Playing career

International honours
Mike O'Neill won caps for Great Britain while at Widnes in 1982, against France and Australia, and in 1983, against France (2 matches).

In addition to the above Test Matches, Mike O'Neill played left-, i.e. number 8, in Great Britain's 7-8 defeat by France in the friendly at Stadio Pier Luigi Penzo, Venice on Saturday 31 July 1982; he also played 5-times for Great Britain Under-24 team.

Mike O'Neill was selected for the 1984 Great Britain Lions tour of Australia and New Zealand.

Championship appearances
Mike O'Neill played in Widnes' victories in the Championship during the 1987–88 season and 1988–89 season.

Premiership Final appearances
Mike O'Neill played in Widnes' 19-5 victory over Bradford Northern in the Premiership Final during the 1979–80 season at Station Road, Swinton on Saturday 17 May 1980, the 23-8 victory over Hull F.C. in the Premiership Final during the 1981–82 season at Headingley Rugby Stadium, Leeds on Saturday 15 May 1982, the 22-10 victory over Hull F.C. in the Premiership Final during the 1982–83 season at Headingley Rugby Stadium, Leeds on Saturday 14 May 1983, the 38-14 victory over Hull F.C. in the Premiership Final during the 1987–88 season at Old Trafford, Manchester on Sunday 15 May 1988, the 18-10 victory over St. Helens in the Premiership Final during the 1988–89 season at Old Trafford, Manchester on Sunday 14 May 1989, and the 28-6 victory over Bradford Northern in the Premiership Final during the 1989–90 season at Old Trafford, Manchester on Sunday 13 May 1990.

Challenge Cup Final appearances
Mike O'Neill played as an interchange/substitute in Widnes' 12-3 victory over Wakefield Trinity in the 1979 Challenge Cup Final during the 1978–79 season at Wembley Stadium, London on Saturday 5 May 1979, in front of a crowd of 94,218, played left-, i.e. number 8, the 18-9 victory over Hull Kingston Rovers in the 1981 Challenge Cup Final during the 1980–81 season at Wembley Stadium, London on Saturday 2 May 1981, in front of a crowd of 92,496, played left-, i.e. number 8, in the 14-14 draw with Hull F.C. in the 1982 Challenge Cup Final during the 1981–82 season at Wembley Stadium, London on Saturday 1 May 1982, in front of a crowd of 92,147, played left- in the 9-18 defeat by Hull F.C. in the 1982 Challenge Cup Final replay during the 1981–82 season at Elland Road, Leeds on Wednesday 19 May 1982, in front of a crowd of 41,171, and played right-, i.e. number 12, the 19-6 victory over Wigan in the 1984 Challenge Cup Final during the 1983–84 season at Wembley Stadium, London on Saturday 5 May 1984, in front of a crowd of 80,116, and was as an interchange/substitute, i.e. number 15, in Leeds' 16-26 defeat by Wigan in the 1994 Challenge Cup Final during the 1993–94 season at Wembley Stadium, London on Saturday 30 April 1994, in front of a crowd of 78,348, in doing so he set, and still holds, the record for the longest time span between first and last Challenge Cup Final appearances.

John Player/John Player Special Trophy Final appearances
Mike O'Neill played(?) in Widnes' 16-4 victory over Warrington in the 1978–79 John Player Trophy Final during the 1978–79 season at Knowsley Road, St. Helens on Saturday 28 April 1979, played , i.e. number 8, in the 10-18 defeat by Leeds in the 1983–84 John Player Special Trophy Final during the 1983–84 season at Central Park, Wigan on Saturday 14 January 1984, and played left-, i.e. number 11, in the 6-12 defeat by Wigan in the 1988–89 John Player Special Trophy Final during the 1988–89 season at Burnden Park, Bolton on Saturday 7 January 1989.

Rugby League Charity Shield
Mike O'Neill played in Widnes' 20-14 victory over Wigan in the Charity Shield during the 1988–89 season at Okells Bowl, Douglas, Isle of Man on Sunday 21 August 1988, and the 27-22 victory over Wigan in the Charity Shield during the 1989–90 season at Anfield, Liverpool on Sunday 27 August 1989.

Genealogical information
Mike O'Neill is the brother of the rugby league footballer, Steve O'Neill.

References

External links
!Great Britain Statistics at englandrl.co.uk (statistics currently missing due to not having appeared for both Great Britain, and England)
Statistics at rugby.widnes.tv

1960 births
Living people
English rugby league players
Great Britain national rugby league team players
Lancashire rugby league team players
Leeds Rhinos players
Rochdale Hornets players
Rugby league players from Widnes
Rugby league props
Widnes Vikings players